Renata Hellmeister de Abreu (born 15 April 1982) is a Brazilian politician. She is a federal deputy for the state of São Paulo and president of the political party Podemos.

Personal life
Abreu is the daughter of the founder of the Podemos party José Masci de Abreu and niece of the co-founder Dorival de Abreu. Her mother is Cristina Hellmeister de Abreu, and she is married to Gabriel Melo and has two children. Abreu is an alumnus of the Mackenzie Presbyterian University.

Political career
Since her time as president of Podemos, Abreu has been successful in persuading other politicians to join her party. Only 8 politicians from the Podemos party were elected to the federal chamber of deputies in the 2014 election, but in April 2018 Abrue managed to persuade a further 14 politicians to switch parties, boosting the number of Podemos in the legislature to 22.

Abreu voted in favor of the impeachment of then-president Dilma Rousseff. Abreu voted in favor of the 2017 Brazilian labor reform, and would vote in favor of a corruption investigation into Rousseff's successor Michel Temer.

References

External links
 
 
 

|-

1982 births
Living people
People from São Paulo
Mackenzie Presbyterian University alumni
Podemos (Brazil) politicians
Members of the Chamber of Deputies (Brazil) from São Paulo
21st-century Brazilian women politicians